USS Raymond is a name used more than once by the United States Navy:

  delivered 21 December 1917 to the Commandant, 2nd Naval District.
  laid down by Consolidated Steel Corp., Orange, Texas, 3 November 1943.

United States Navy ship names